Jianping may refer to:

Locations
Jianping County, a county in Liaoning, China
Jianping, Jianping County, a town in Jianping County
Jianping, Anhui, a town in Langxi County, Anhui, China
Jianping, Sichuan, a town in Santai County, Sichuan, China
Jianping Township, a township in Wushan County, Chongqing, China

Historical eras
Jianping (6BC–3BC), era name used by Emperor Ai of Han
Jianping (330–333), era name used by Shi Le, emperor of Later Zhao
Jianping (386), era name used by Murong Yao, emperor of Western Yan
Jianping (398), era name used by Murong Sheng, emperor of Later Yan
Jianping (400–405), era name used by Murong De, emperor of Southern Yan